Joseph W. Torrey was a Michigan politician.

Early life
Torrey was born in Connecticut. At some point, Torrey moved to the Michigan Territory.

Career
Torrey was a lawyer. Torrey served recorder of Detroit in 1829 and as probate judge from 1829 to 1833. He was supporter of President Andrew Jackson during his time in Detroit. Torrey served on the Michigan Territorial Council from May 1, 1832 to April 23, 1833.

Death
Torrey moved back to Connecticut in 1844, and died the same year.

References

1844 deaths
People from Connecticut
Politicians from Detroit
Members of the Michigan Territorial Legislature
Michigan Jacksonians
19th-century American politicians
19th-century American lawyers
19th-century American judges